Schizogyne is a plant genus in the tribe Inuleae within the family Asteraceae. It was established in 1828 by French botanist Alexandre de Cassini.

 Species
 Schizogyne glaberrima DC. - Canary Islands (Tenerife + Gran Canaria)
 Schizogyne obtusifolia Cass. - Canary Islands (Tenerife)
 Schizogyne sericea (L.f.) DC. - Canary Islands, Salvage Islands

References

Asteraceae genera
Inuleae